The 2002 Miami Hurricanes football team represented the University of Miami during the 2002 NCAA Division I-A football season. It was the Hurricanes' 77th season of football and 12th as a member of the Big East Conference. The Hurricanes were led by second-year head coach Larry Coker and played their home games at the Orange Bowl. They finished the season 12–1 overall and 7–0 in the Big East to finish as conference champion. They were invited to the Fiesta Bowl, which served as the BCS National Championship Game, and lost against Ohio State, 31–24, in double overtime.

Pre-season
Miami had just come off a national championship season.  Many of the starters left for the NFL, but a few key players, including quarterback Ken Dorsey, wide receiver Andre Johnson, and linebackers Jonathan Vilma and D. J. Williams returned. Despite the loss of numerous starters, Miami was still ranked 1st in the preseason coaches poll.

Pre-season awards
 Andre Johnson- Blietnikoff Award Watch List
 Ken Dorsey- Davey O'Brien Award Watch List, Walter Camp Player of the Year Award candidate
 Brett Romberg- Rimington Trophy Watch List, Outland Trophy Watch List
 Sherko Haji-Rasouli (OG)- Outland Trophy Watch List
 William Joseph (DT)- Outland Trophy Watch List
 Matt Walters (DT)- Outland Trophy Watch List
 Todd Sievers- Groza Award Preseason Watch List

Schedule

Roster

Depth chart
Bold indicates starters at that position. Bold italics indicates a returning starter.

Offense
QB- Ken Dorsey,  Derrick Crudup, Eric Moore
FB- Kyle Cobia, Quadtrine Hill
RB- Willis McGahee, Jarrett Payton, Frank Gore
WR- Andre Johnson,  Roscoe Parrish Jason Geathers
WR- Kevin Beard,  Ethenic Sands
TE- Kellen Winslow II, David Williams
LT- Carlos Joseph, Tony Tella
LG- Sherko Haji-Rasouli,  Joe McGrath
C- Brett Romberg. Joel Rodriguez
RG- Ed Wilkins,  Chris Myers
RT- Vernon Carey , Rashad Butler

Defense
DE- Andrew Williams,  Jamaal Green
DT- Matt Walters,  Santonio Thomas
DT- William Joseph, Vince Wilfork
DE- Jerome McDougle, Cornelius Green
WLB- D.J. Williams, Jerrel Weaver
MLB- Jonathan Vilma,  Leon Williams 
SLB- Howard Clark,  Rocky McIntosh
CB- Antrel Rolle, Jean Leone
CB- Kelly Jennings, Al Marshall
SS- Maurice Sikes, Marcus Maxey
FS- Sean Taylor, James Scott

Special teams
K- Todd Sievers, Mark Gent
P- Freddie Capshaw, Dan Lundy
KR- Roscoe Parrish

Season recap

Florida A&M

at Florida

at Temple

Boston College

Connecticut

Florida State

at West Virginia

at Rutgers

at Tennessee

Pittsburgh

at Syracuse

Virginia Tech

vs. Ohio State (Fiesta Bowl)

Statistics
 QB Ken Dorsey: 222/393 (56.5%) for 3,369 yards (8.57) with 28 TD vs. 12 INT (3.05%).
 RB Willis McGahee: 282 carries for 1,753 yards (6.22) and 28 TD. 27 catches for 355 yards and 0 TD.
 WR Andre Johnson: 52 catches for 1,092 yards (21.00) and 9 TD.
 TE Kellen Winslow Jr.: 57 catches for 726 yards (12.74) and 8 TD.
 K Todd Sievers: 12/20 (60.0%) on FG with 63 XPM. Long FG of 53 yards.

Awards
 Brett Romberg- Rimmington Trophy

References

Miami
Miami Hurricanes football seasons
Big East Conference football champion seasons
Lambert-Meadowlands Trophy seasons
Miami Hurricanes football